The CCCF Championship was an association football (soccer) tournament made for teams in the area of Central America and the Caribbean between the years of 1941 and 1961. It was founded in 1938 and the precursor of the CONCACAF, that was formed when the Confederación Centroamericana y del Caribe de Fútbol (CCCF) merged with the North American Football Confederation (NAFC) in 1961. 

The North American Football Confederation also organized the NAFC Championship in 1947 and 1949, which was revived in 1990 and 1991, after 41 years of absence, before the introduction of the CONCACAF Gold Cup.

The CCCF Championship was succeeded by the CONCACAF Championship in 1963, following the merger.

Tournament results 
List of the final four.

Titles by team

Competitive history 

Legend
 – Champions
 – Runners-up
 – Third place
 – Fourth place
QF – Quarter Finals
GS – Group stage
q – Qualified
 — Hosts

Winning managers

References 

 
International association football competitions in the Caribbean
International association football competitions in Central America
Defunct international association football competitions in North America
Recurring sporting events established in 1941
Recurring sporting events disestablished in 1961
1941 establishments in North America
1961 disestablishments in North America